"Lie" is the first single by Black Light Burns from their debut album Cruel Melody. It was released to radio on March 20, 2007.

Charts

References 

2007 debut singles
2007 songs
Songs written by Wes Borland
Black Light Burns songs